The Kenvale College of Hospitality & Cookery and Events is a private college for those students who have an interest in Commercial Cookery, Event Management and/or Hospitality. It is located in Randwick, New South Wales and is opposite the University of New South Wales. The college claims to be the first school of hospitality in  Australia founded in 1971.

Educational institutions established in 1971
Hospitality schools in Australia
Universities in Sydney